

The Real Property Administrator (RPA) designation is a professional designation for commercial property managers awarded to people with years of experience after completing the Building Owners and Managers Association advanced study program.[1][2] Building Owners and Managers Institute (BOMI) International, an independent nonprofit institute for property and facility management education, administers the designation.[3] The program covers all aspects of operating a commercial property and maximizing a net income while minimizing risk.[4]

Required coursework includes:
 Law and Risk management
 Budgeting and accounting
 Environmental health and safety
 Business ethics
 Real estate investment and finance
 Design operation and maintenance of building systems

See also
 English land law
 Property manager

References

External links 
 Building Owners and Managers Institute (BOMI) International
 Building Owners and Managers Association (BOMA) International

Property management
Financial services occupations